The Triple Crown is an accomplishment recognized by various professional wrestling promotions. It is a distinction made to a professional wrestler who has won three of a single promotion's championships; specifically, a world championship, another singles championship, and a tag team championship. Promotions to officially recognize Triple Crown winners include WWE, Impact Wrestling, and Ring of Honor as well as the defunct promotions World Championship Wrestling, Extreme Championship Wrestling, and Lucha Underground.

National promotions

Extreme Championship Wrestling 
The Extreme Championship Wrestling (ECW) Triple Crown consisted of the ECW World Heavyweight Championship, the ECW World Television Championship and the ECW World Tag Team Championship. ECW was founded in 1992 as Eastern Championship Wrestling until the name was changed to Extreme Championship Wrestling in 1994. While Johnny Hotbody won all three titles before 1994, sources consider Mikey Whipwreck the first Triple Crown Champion.

List of ECW Triple Crown winners

Impact Wrestling

In Impact Wrestling (formerly TNA), the Triple Crown was an accolade bestowed upon those who won (not necessarily concurrently) all three championships regularly contested in TNA between 2002 and 2007: the NWA World Heavyweight Championship, the TNA X Division Championship, and one-half of the NWA World Tag Team Championship. It was unknown whether or not those who won the NWA World Heavyweight and NWA World Tag Team Championships before or after TNA's acquisition and usage of the title belts would qualify for the Triple Crown.

In May 2007, TNA lost the rights to the NWA Worlds Heavyweight Championship and the NWA World Tag Team Championship and introduced the TNA World Heavyweight Championship and the TNA World Tag Team Championship. On July 8, 2007, Impact Wrestling (then known as TNA) stated that, should the then- X Division Champion Samoa Joe win the TNA World Tag Team Championship, this would leave him "just one step shy of becoming only the second Triple Crown Champion". This indicates that the TNA World Heavyweight Championship and the TNA World Tag Team Championship are part of the existing Triple Crown accolade.

List of Impact Wrestling Triple Crown winners 
The following is a list of Impact Triple Crown winners with dates indicating the wrestler's first reign with the respective championship. Under Impact's definition of the Triple Crown, wrestlers are eligible to win the Triple Crown each time they complete a new circuit.

To date, A.J. Styles and Eddie Edwards have won the Impact Triple Crown on more than one occasion, and Styles is the only wrestler to hold all of the eligible championships. Kurt Angle completed the Triple Crown the fastest, achieving it in a mere 92 days, between May and August 2007, and is the only wrestler to hold all the required championships at once. 

Jordynne Grace become the first Knockouts Triple Crown winner after winning Impact Knockouts Championship, Impact Knockouts Tag Team Championship and the Impact Digital Media Championship - which is open to all Impact wrestlers.

List of Knockouts Triple Crown winners

Lucha Libre AAA Worldwide 

Lucha Libre AAA Worldwide had eight established titles in its promotion, but recognises the AAA Mega Championship, the AAA Latin American Championship and, World Tag Team Championship as its Triple Crown.

Fenix completed the AAA Triple Crown the fastest, achieving it in 1,098 days between March 2019 and June 2022.

List of AAA Triple Crown winners

Lucha Underground 
Lucha Underground had three established titles in its promotion, the Lucha Underground Championship, the Gift of the Gods Championship and, uniquely, Trios Championship.

Johnny Mundo completed the Lucha Underground Triple Crown the fastest, achieving it in a mere 85 days between January and April 2016.

List of Lucha Underground Triple Crown winners

New Japan Pro-Wrestling 

The New Japan Pro-Wrestling Triple Crown consisted of the IWGP Heavyweight Championship, the IWGP Intercontinental Championship and the NEVER Openweight Championship. The NJPW Triple Crown is unique as it consists of three singles championships, instead of a tag team championship in addition to two singles.

The IWGP Heavyweight and Intercontinental championships were retired in 2021, and it is unknown if NJPW considers their replacement, the IWGP World Heavyweight Championship, as a suitable accolade for the Triple Crown. It is also unknown if it considers the IWGP United States Heavyweight Championship as a part of the accolade, although it is considered part of their Grand Slam.

List of New Japan Pro-Wrestling Triple Crown winners

Ring of Honor 

The Ring of Honor (ROH) Triple Crown originally was defined as the ROH World Championship, the ROH World Tag Team Championship, and the ROH World Television Championship. It was later amended so that the World Championship and any combination of the Television, Tag Team or ROH Pure Championship would qualify.  The ROH World Six Man Tag Team Championship is not part of the Triple Crown, but when added to the Triple Crown it forms the ROH Grand Slam.

Eddie Edwards completed the ROH Triple Crown the fastest, completing it in 709 days, between April 2009 and March 2011.

List of ROH Triple Crown winners

World Championship Wrestling 

The World Championship Wrestling (WCW) Triple Crown consisted of the WCW World Heavyweight Championship, the WCW United States Heavyweight Championship (now the WWE United States Championship) and the WCW World Tag Team Championship.

When Bret Hart and Goldberg won the WCW World Tag Team Championship, they both became Triple Crown winners at the same time. Chris Benoit completed the WCW Triple Crown the fastest, completing it in 309 days between March 1999 and January 2000.

List of WCW Triple Crown winners

WWE 

In WWE (formerly known as the World Wide Wrestling Federation/WWWF and World Wrestling Federation/WWF), the term Triple Crown Champion has traditionally been used to describe a wrestler who has won the WWE Championship, the Intercontinental Championship, and the (now defunct) World Tag Team Championship (as shown above from left to right with The Miz). For a span of nearly 18 years, from 1979 up through 1997, these were the only three championships of the company, and a wrestler who won all three championships (not necessarily concurrently) was considered a "Triple Crown Champion". Until the 1990s, the accomplishment was extremely rare, with Pedro Morales remaining the sole Triple Crown winner for more than a decade.

Following the first brand extension between 2002 and 2011, the (now defunct) World Heavyweight Championship and the WWE Tag Team Championship became alternate titles that could compose part of WWE's Triple Crown. After the respective unifications of the two world championships and two tag team championships, the only three eligible Triple Crown championships of WWE became the WWE Championship, Intercontinental Championship, and WWE Tag Team Championship (now called the Raw Tag Team Championship). A total of eight men have won all five eligible championships; Edge, Chris Jericho, Shawn Michaels, Triple H, Kane, Big Show, Jeff Hardy and Randy Orton.

Although the United States Championship is the counterpart to the Intercontinental Championship, it has not been designated as an acceptable substitute for the Triple Crown, though in 2015, it became a required championship for WWE's Grand Slam. In July 2016, a second brand extension period began and two new titles were introduced: the Universal Championship and the SmackDown Tag Team Championship. In January 2017, these were designated as acceptable substitutes for their counterpart titles in the Grand Slam, but WWE have not yet confirmed if they are acceptable substitutes for the Triple Crown. Only five wrestlers have become a Triple Crown winner since the new titles were established, and for three of them, although they have held one of the newer titles, their Triple Crown designation is recognized by their previous titles held (Seth Rollins and Roman Reigns have each held the Universal Championship while Kofi Kingston, The Miz, Jeff Hardy, and Daniel Bryan have each held the SmackDown Tag Team Championship, but these wrestlers had already held the required titles in those tiers). At WrestleMania 36, Braun Strowman won the Universal Championship after previously holding the Intercontinental and Raw Tag Team Championships, but WWE did not recognize him as a Triple Crown winner.

CM Punk holds the record for completing the Triple Crown in the shortest amount of time between the first and third title. It took him 203 days between June 2008 and January 2009. The wrestler holding the record for most time between the first and third title is Ric Flair, for whom it took 4998 days between January 1992 and September 2005.

List of WWE Men's Triple Crown winners 
The following is a list of WWE Triple Crown winners with dates indicating the wrestler's first or only reign with the respective championship.

List of WWE Tag Team Triple Crown winners 

The following is a list of WWE Tag Team Triple Crown winners, indicating they have won all three of the tag team championships for men (Raw, SmackDown, and NXT) currently available in WWE. Dates indicate the wrestler's first reign with the respective championship. Only tag teams who have completed this are included, individuals such as Jason Jordan and Chad Gable (who won the NXT and SmackDown Tag Team championships as a team, but won the Raw Tag Team Championship separately) are excluded.

The WWE Tag Team Triple Crown was established after The Revival won the SmackDown Tag Team Championships in September 2019. The Street Profits has to date completed the Men's Tag Team Triple Crown the fastest, with  days between their first qualifying title win and Triple Crown achieving win.

With his NXT Tag Team Championship win with New Day teammate Xavier Woods, Kofi Kingston became the first (and thus far only) wrestler to have won both the traditional and tag team version of the WWE Triple Crown.

List of WWE Women's Triple Crown winners 
 
On May 22, 2019, a women’s Triple Crown was established, consisting of (from left to right above with Bayley) the Raw Women's Championship, SmackDown Women's Championship, and the WWE Women's Tag Team Championship. With the announcement, Bayley - who had won the SmackDown Women's Championship for the first time three days prior - was recognized as the inaugural WWE Women's Triple Crown Champion, after having previously held the Raw and Women's Tag Team championships.

Bayley has also been referred to as a Grand Slam Champion after her win, for having also held the NXT Women's Championship. Asuka has to date completed the Women's Triple Crown the fastest, with 486 days between her first qualifying title win and Triple Crown achieving win.

List of WWE NXT Triple Crown winners 

WWE's NXT Triple Crown consists of the NXT Championship, NXT North American Championship, and NXT Tag Team Championship. The NXT brand was originally established as a developmental territory for WWE's main roster in 2012, was elevated to the third global brand in 2019, but after being rebooted as NXT 2.0 in 2021, was returned to its original status as a developmental brand.  

Johnny Gargano became the first to be recognized as the NXT Triple Crown Champion, winning his first NXT Championship, and having previously held the NXT North American and NXT Tag Team championships.

Adam Cole has completed the NXT Triple Crown the fastest, doing so within 420 days, between April 2018 and June 2019.

List of WWE NXT UK Triple Crown winners 

The NXT UK Triple Crown consisted of the NXT UK Championship, the defunct NXT UK Heritage Cup Championship and the NXT UK Tag Team Championship. Tyler Bate was the only wrestler to achieve the feat, completing it on December 9, 2021 after winning the tag team titles with Trent Seven. He previous became the first UK Champion in 2017 (the title was then known as the WWE United Kingdom Championship) and later won the Heritage Cup in May 2021.

Regional/independent promotions

All American Wrestling 

All American Wrestling (AAW) is an independent regional promotion. Their version consists of the AAW Heavyweight Championship, the AAW Heritage Championship and the AAW Tag Team Championship.

List of AAW Triple Crown winners

Chaotic Wrestling 
Chaotic Wrestling is an independent regional promotion. Their version consists of the Chaotic Wrestling Heavyweight Championship, the Chaotic Wrestling New England Championship and the Chaotic Wrestling Tag Team Championship.

List of Chaotic Triple Crown winners

Combat Zone Wrestling 
Combat Zone Wrestling (CZW) is an independent regional promotion. Their version consists of the CZW World Heavyweight Championship, the CZW World Tag Team Championship, CZW Wired Championship and CZW World Junior Heavyweight Championship.

List of CZW Triple Crown winners

Explosive Pro Wrestling 
Explosive Pro Wrestling (EPW) is an Australian independent regional promotion. Their version consists of the EPW Heavyweight Championship, the EPW Tag Team Championship, and the EPW Coastal Championship.

List of EPW Triple Crown winners

Full Impact Pro 
Full Impact Pro (FIP) is an independent regional promotion. Their version consists of the FIP World Heavyweight Championship, the FIP Florida Heritage Championship and the FIP Tag Team Championship.

List of FIP Triple Crown winners

Ice Ribbon 
 is a joshi puroresu (women's professional wrestling) promotion. Their version consists of the ICE×60/ICE×∞ Championship, the International Ribbon Tag Team Championship
and the Triangle Ribbon Championship.

List of Ice Ribbon Triple Crown winners

Insane Championship Wrestling 
Insane Championship Wrestling (ICW) is a British wrestling promotion based in Glasgow, Scotland. Their version consists of the ICW World Heavyweight Championship, the ICW Tag Team Championship, and ICW Zero-G Championship.

List of ICW Triple Crown winners

Melbourne City Wrestling 
Melbourne City Wrestling (MCW) is an Australian independent professional wrestling promotion founded in October 2010, in Melbourne, Victoria, Australia. Their version consists of the MCW Heavyweight Championship, the MCW Tag Team Championship, and MCW Intercommonwealth Championship.

List of MCW Triple Crown winners

Ohio Valley Wrestling 

Ohio Valley Wrestling (OVW) is an independent regional promotion that at various points served as a developmental territory for WWE and Impact Wrestling (with whom OVW is once again currently affiliated). Their version consists of the OVW Heavyweight Championship, the OVW Television Championship and the OVW Southern Tag Team Championship.

List of OVW Triple Crown winners

Philippine Wrestling Revolution
Philippine Wrestling Revolution (PWR) is an independent promotion based in the Philippines. Their version consists of the PWR Championship, the PWR Tag Team Championship and the Philippine Excellence (PHX) Championship.

List of PWR Triple Crown winners

Pro-Wrestling: EVE 
Pro-Wrestling: EVE (EVE) is a British independent women's professional wrestling promotion. Their version consists of the Pro-Wrestling: EVE Championship, Pro-Wrestling: EVE International Championship, and the Pro-Wrestling: EVE Tag Team Championship.

List of Pro-Wrestling: EVE Triple Crown winners

Revolution Pro Wrestling 

Revolution Pro Wrestling (RPW) is a United Kingdom based promotion. Their version consists of the British Heavyweight Championship, the Undisputed British Tag Team Championship and the British Cruiserweight Championship.

List of RPW Triple Crown winners

Notes

References

External links 
 

Professional wrestling accomplishments